Teri Kang is a mountain peak located at  in northern Bhutan.

Location 
Due to the low prominence of 464 m, Teri Kang is considered as sub-peak of It is part of Tongshanjiabu, not an independent mountain. The north and south flanks of the peak are drained via the West Pho Chhu.

Climbing history 
According to the Himalayan Index, no expedition has officially climbed Teri Kang yet.

References 

Mountains of Bhutan
Seven-thousanders of the Himalayas